The 1993 North Texas Mean Green football team was an American football team that represented the University of North Texas during the 1993 NCAA Division I-AA football season as a member of the Southland Conference. In their third year under head coach Dennis Parker, the team compiled a 4–7 record.

Schedule

References

North Texas State
North Texas Mean Green football seasons
North Texas State Mean Green football